Åke Henry Samuelsson (23 October 1913 – 4 July 1995) was a Swedish footballer who played for Elfsborg. He featured three times for the Sweden national football team in 1935 and 1936, scoring three goals.

Career statistics

International

International goals
Scores and results list Sweden's goal tally first.

References

1913 births
1995 deaths
People from Borås
Swedish footballers
Sweden international footballers
Association football forwards
IF Elfsborg players
Sportspeople from Västra Götaland County